Håkvik Chapel is a parish church of the Church of Norway in Narvik Municipality in Nordland county, Norway.  It is located in the village of Håkvik. It is one of the churches for the Ankenes parish which is part of the Ofoten prosti (deanery) in the Diocese of Sør-Hålogaland. The brown, wooden church was built in a long church style in 1980 using plans drawn up by the architect Einar Karstad. The church seats about 180 people.

See also
List of churches in Sør-Hålogaland

References

Narvik
Churches in Nordland
Wooden churches in Norway
20th-century Church of Norway church buildings
Churches completed in 1980
1980 establishments in Norway
Long churches in Norway